Batihat al-Wafidin (also spelled Btihet Elwafedine) is a Syrian village located in Douma District. Batihat al-Wafidin had a population of 16,539 in the 2004 census.

References

Populated places in Douma District